Ira D. Gruber (born January 6, 1934) is an American author, bibliographer, and military historian of the American Revolution.

Personal life 
Ira D. Gruber was born January 6, 1934, in Philadelphia, Pennsylvania and grew up in Pottstown, Pennsylvania. He attended Duke University and served in the United States Navy Reserve. From 1955-1957 he held the title of crypto security officer  on the USS Wiltsie.

Career 
Gruber became a professor at Duke after earning his Ph.D. in 1961. He later held the positions of fellow at the Institute of Early American History and Culture, assistant professor of history at Occidental College, and Harris Masterson, Jr. Professor -- and later (from 2009 on) Professor Emeritus -- of History at Rice University.

During his long teaching career, Gruber published several works on the theme of American military history, specifically regarding the American Revolution. Books and the British Army in the Age of the American Revolution examines the books read by military officers during the revolution and how these books may have influenced their techniques and decisions. Another book, The Howe Brothers and the American Revolution, discusses the failure of the Howe Brothers to restore the British government in America.

Awards 
 1974 and 2001 George R. Brown Award for Superior Teaching, Rice University
 1998 Edwin H. Simmons Award given by Society for Military History
 2013 Samuel Eliot Morison Prize for lifetime achievement given by Society for Military History

Works

References

External links 
 Ira Gruber Academic Career Papers
 Review of John Peebles' American War

1934 births
Living people
American military historians
American male non-fiction writers
Duke University alumni